Xenocharax spilurus is a species of distichodontid fish found in Cameroon, the Democratic Republic of Congo, and Gabon.

References

Distichodontidae
Fish of Africa
Taxa named by Albert Günther